Creed III is a 2023 American sports drama film directed by and starring Michael B. Jordan (in his directorial debut) from a screenplay by Keenan Coogler and Zach Baylin. It is the sequel to Creed II (2018), the third in the Creed series, and the ninth overall in the Rocky film series. It also stars Tessa Thompson, Jonathan Majors, Wood Harris, Florian Munteanu and Phylicia Rashad. In the film, the accomplished and recently retired boxer Adonis Creed (Jordan) comes face-to-face with his childhood friend and former boxing prodigy Damian Anderson (Majors).

A third Creed film was officially announced in September 2019, alongside Jordan's return; he was also confirmed to be making his directorial debut in October 2020. Majors and the remainder of the cast joined between November 2021 and September 2022; Creed III is the first film in the series not to feature Sylvester Stallone reprising his role as Rocky Balboa, though he is credited as a producer alongside Ryan Coogler, who contributed to the film's story. Principal photography began in January 2022 and lasted until that April, with filming locations including Los Angeles, Tampa, and Georgia.

Creed III first premiered in Mexico City on February 9, 2023. It was then theatrically released in the United States on March 3 as the first film distributed by Metro-Goldwyn-Mayer after its acquisition by Amazon. The film received positive reviews from critics and has grossed $224 million worldwide, making it the fourth-highest grossing film of 2023.

Plot 

In 2002 Los Angeles, a young Adonis "Donnie" Creed sneaks out with his best friend, Golden Gloves champion Damian "Diamond Dame" Anderson, to watch him compete in an underground boxing match. After Dame's victory, he tells Donnie about his aspirations to turn professional and become a world champion. During a detour at a liquor store, Donnie impulsively attacks a man named Leon.

In 2020, Donnie wins a rematch against "Pretty" Ricky Conlan, newly released from prison. Donnie retires from boxing to focus on his wife Bianca and their daughter Amara, whose hearing impairment has since led the family to become fluent in American Sign Language. Three years later in 2023, Donnie runs Delphi Boxing Academy with Tony "Little Duke" Evers Jr., and is promoting his protégé, world champion Felix "El Guerrero" Chavez, in a match against Viktor Drago. Due to her hearing problems, Bianca forgoes performing and becomes a successful producer. While the two watch the declining health of Donnie's adoptive mother Mary-Anne, Amara aspires to become a boxer like Donnie, which gets her into trouble at school for punching another student.

Dame reconnects with Donnie after getting out of jail, and shares his desire to resume his boxing career. Donnie reluctantly invites Dame to the gym to spar with Chavez, however, his aggressive style draws scorn from Chavez and Duke. Dame later visits Donnie's home, where he meets his family and recounts their time together at a group home, a story that Bianca had never heard. Privately, Dame asks for a title shot against Chavez, citing Donnie's previous one-in-a-million shot, which Donnie calls impossible.

At a party for Bianca's record label, Dame cryptically tells Bianca about Leon and that Donnie was keeping it secret from her. Drago is attacked by an unknown assailant and is too injured to participate in his match against Chavez. Not wanting to lose his investment in the event, Donnie suggests Dame as an opponent, pitching an underdog fight much like Rocky Balboa's first title shot, which Chavez accepts. During the fight, Dame fights dirty, but knocks out Chavez, winning the undisputed heavyweight championship.

Following the match, an uneasy Donnie visits Mary-Anne, who shows him letters Dame had written to Donnie while in prison that she kept from him due to believing he was a bad influence. One letter contains a picture showing Dame with a fellow inmate that Donnie recognizes as Drago's assailant. Realizing Dame orchestrated the attack, Donnie confronts him. Dame reveals that he manipulated Donnie and his family to get his title shot, before giving him a black eye. Donnie is unable to open up to Bianca about his guilt over Dame, who revels in his newfound fame and publicly slanders Donnie as a fraud who turned his back on him.

Mary-Anne suffers another stroke and dies in front of Donnie after a conversation with him, while Mary-Anne believes him to be Apollo. After her funeral, Donnie confesses to Bianca that Leon was the abusive caregiver in the group home he and Dame lived in before he was adopted. After Donnie attacked Leon at the liquor store, the ensuing brawl with Leon's friends caused Dame to pull a gun. When the police arrived, Donnie fled, but Dame was arrested. Attempting to block out the memory, Donnie never contacted Dame out of shame and guilt. Knowing Dame will not stop defaming him, he tells Bianca there's only one way to bring him down.

Donnie goes on First Take, where Dame calls in to goad Donnie over the phone. Donnie decides to come out of retirement and challenges Dame for the championship, which he accepts. After training with Duke and a recovered Drago, Donnie faces Dame in the "Battle of Los Angeles" at Dodger Stadium. In a grueling, evenly-matched affair, Donnie has visions of his abusive foster home and Dame's life in jail, leading to a knockdown in the final round.  Donnie sees his family in the crowd and lets go of his fear and guilt, and knocks out Dame to win the match and regain the championship. Afterward, Donnie reconciles with Dame, with both men admitting it was not the other's fault. Donnie joins Bianca and Amara in the ring in the empty stadium, where he pretends to box with Amara.

Cast 

 Michael B. Jordan as Adonis "Donnie" Creed (né Johnson)
 Thaddeus J. Mixon as 15-year-old Adonis "Donnie" Johnson
 Tessa Thompson as Bianca Taylor-Creed
 Jonathan Majors as Damian "Diamond Dame" Anderson
 Spence Moore II as 18-year-old Damian "Dame" Anderson
 Wood Harris as Tony "Little Duke" Evers
 Florian Munteanu as Viktor Drago
 Phylicia Rashad as Mary Anne Creed
 Mila Davis-Kent as Amara Creed
 José Benavidez Jr. as Felix Chavez
 Selenis Leyva as Laura Chavez

Additionally, Tony Bellew reprises his role as "Pretty" Ricky Conlan from the first film. Sports television personality Stephen A. Smith, boxer Canelo Álvarez and singer Kehlani make cameo appearances as themselves.

Production

Development 
In December 2018, in response to the suggestion that Deontay Wilder could play the son of Clubber Lang in a potential sequel to Creed II (2018), Sylvester Stallone and Michael B. Jordan expressed interest. In September 2019, Jordan confirmed that Creed III was officially in active development.

Pre-production 
In February 2020, Zach Baylin was announced as screenwriter, with Jordan confirmed to reprise his role as Adonis Creed. In October 2020, it was reported that Jordan would reprise his role of Adonis Creed and make his directorial debut in Creed III. Producers had expressed interest in having Jordan serve as director, with Irwin Winkler stating that he had personally offered the position to the actor. In April 2021, Stallone announced he was not cast in the film. By June 2021, Jonathan Majors entered talks to portray Adonis's new adversary. In November 2021, it was officially confirmed that Majors was cast. In April 2022, it was announced that Wood Harris and Florian Munteanu would reprise their roles from previous Creed films, and Selenis Leyva, Thaddeus J. Mixson, Spence Moore II, and Mila Davis-Kent joined the cast. In September 2022, Mexican boxer Canelo Álvarez was cast in an undisclosed role.

Filming 
Principal photography began in late January 2022, and Jordan was seen on the set in Atlanta, Georgia. Kramer Morgenthau returned as the cinematographer for the film, after having done so for Creed II. The film was shot on IMAX-certified Sony CineAlta Venice cameras and the Panavision anamorphic format, making this the first film in the series, and the first sports film in history, to do so. Filming later ended on April 6, 2022.

Post-production 
In May 2022, the final writing credits were officiated. Ryan Coogler (director and co-writer of Creed , executive producer on Creed II, and producer on Creed III) received story credit with Keenan Coogler and Baylin, and the latter two received screenplay credit. Tyler Nelson was editor.

Influences 
Jordan has cited anime series such as Megalobox, Naruto, Hajime No Ippo, and Dragon Ball Z as heavy influences for the fight choreography.

Release 
Creed III premiered in Mexico City on February 9, 2023, and was released in the United States on March 3. It was originally scheduled to be theatrically released on November 23, 2022 by Metro-Goldwyn-Mayer in the United States, and Warner Bros. Pictures internationally, but on July 28, it was delayed to March 3.

It is the first MGM film to not be distributed by United Artists Releasing after Amazon shut down the distributor's operations and folded it into MGM.

Music

In October 2022, it was announced that composer Joseph Shirley would score Creed III. Shirley was previously part of Ludwig Göransson's team scoring the first two films in the series, as a technical score engineer and score programmer. On November 20, 2022, Jordan announced that J. Cole and Dreamville executive produced Creed III: The Soundtrack.

Reception

Box office
, Creed III has grossed $127.7 million in the United States and Canada, and $96.6 million in other territories, for a worldwide total of $224.3 million.

In the United States and Canada, Creed III was released alongside Demon Slayer: Kimetsu no Yaiba – To the Swordsmith Village and Operation Fortune: Ruse de Guerre, was projected to gross $38–40 million from 4,007 theaters in its opening weekend. The film made $22 million on its first day, including $5.45 million from Wednesday and Thursday night previews (the best total of the trilogy), increasing estimates to $50 million. The weekend totaled $58.7 million, topping the box office and marking the best-ever opening weekend for the Rocky franchise. The film made $27.3 million in its sophomore weekend, finishing second behind newcomer Scream VI, and then $15.3 million in its third weekend.

Critical response

  Audiences surveyed by CinemaScore gave the film an average grade of "A–" on an A+ to F scale, while those polled by PostTrak gave it a 92% positive score, with 80% saying they would definitely recommend it.

Future
On February 2, 2023, Jordan confirmed that a fourth Creed film was happening "for sure" and that spin-offs were also being considered. When asked about the future of the Creed movie franchise in a interview with ScreenRant Plus, Jordan said "But you will see the Creed-verse continue to grow and expand. I think that we invested in some really interesting characters that I think a lot of people were responding to. I have to give a political answer to that. [laughs] There's going to be more of the Creed family, and there's gonna be more of some of the characters that you love from this movie. I just don't know what package it's going to be in yet".

See also
 List of films featuring the deaf and hard of hearing

References

External links 
 
 Creed III at MGM Studios
 

2023 directorial debut films
2023 drama films
2023 films
2020s American films
2020s English-language films
2020s sports drama films
African-American films
African-American drama films
American sequel films
American Sign Language films
American sports drama films
Films about bullying
Films directed by Michael B. Jordan
Films set in 2002
Films set in 2017
Films set in 2022
Films set in Los Angeles
Films set in South Africa
Films shot in Atlanta
IMAX films
Metro-Goldwyn-Mayer films
Rocky (film series) films
Warner Bros. films
Films about child abuse